Alexandre Yougbare (born 1964) is a Burkinabé sprinter. He competed in the men's 100 metres at the 1988 Summer Olympics.

References

External links
 

1964 births
Living people
Athletes (track and field) at the 1988 Summer Olympics
Burkinabé male sprinters
Olympic athletes of Burkina Faso
Place of birth missing (living people)
21st-century Burkinabé people